Food Standards Australia New Zealand  (FSANZ) (Māori: Te Mana Kounga Kai – Ahitereiria me Aotearoa), formerly Australia New Zealand Food Authority (ANZFA), is the statutory authority in the Australian Government Health portfolio that is responsible for developing food standards for Australia and New Zealand.

Description
FSANZ develops the standards in consultation with experts, other government agencies and stakeholders; the standards are enforced by state and territory departments, agencies and local councils in Australia, the Ministry for Primary Industries in New Zealand, and the Australian Department of Agriculture, Water and the Environment for food imported into Australia. The recommendations made by the body are open and accountable, and based upon a rigorous scientific assessment of risk to public health and safety.

All decisions made by FSANZ must be approved by the Australia and New Zealand Food Regulation Ministerial Council, which is composed of the Health Minister from each of the Australian states and territories, and the Health Minister from New Zealand, and other participating Ministers nominated by each jurisdiction. This may lead to political interference in the decision: for example the decision made over hemp seed, when the Food Standards scientists recommended that hemp seed be allowed for sale, the ministers vetoed this because they did not want to appear soft on drugs.

Publications from FSANZ include the Australian Total Diet Survey and Shoppers' Guide to Food Additives and labels.

Nomenclature
This authority is sometimes cited variously as Australia and New Zealand Food Standards/Safety Authority (ANZFSA), possibly incorrect nomenclature arising due to confusion with the old initialism ANZFA, and with the acronym of the New Zealand authority, New Zealand Food Safety, which previously managed such questions in New Zealand.

See also 
 Australian Competition & Consumer Commission
 Australian Food Safety Information Council
 Food quality
 Food safety
 Food safety in Australia
 Food safety in New Zealand
 New Zealand Food Safety Authority
 Standards Australia

Notes and references

External links

Australian Pesticides and Veterinary Medicines Authority

Standards organisations in New Zealand
Commonwealth Government agencies of Australia
Scientific organisations based in Australia
Medical and health organisations based in Australia
Government agencies of New Zealand
Standards organisations in Australia
Food safety organizations
Food safety in New Zealand
Food safety in Australia
Trans-Tasman organisations
Regulation in Australia
Regulation in New Zealand